John Parkinson Dehlin  is an American podcast host and excommunicated member of the Church of Jesus Christ of Latter-day Saints (LDS Church). He holds a PhD in psychology. Dehlin founded the Mormon Stories Podcast, as well as several other Mormon-themed podcasts, blogs, and web sites. He was an influential early participant in the Mormon blogosphere, and blogs at Patheos.com. He has advocated for the rights of skeptics in Mormonism, LGBT rights, equality for women, and other individual views outside mainstream Mormonism.

Early life and education
Born in Boise, Idaho, and raised in Katy, Texas, he attended Brigham Young University (BYU) in Provo, Utah. He graduated summa cum laude with a Bachelor of Arts degree in political science in 1993. In 2007, Dehlin also completed a Master of Science degree in Instructional Technology. In 2015, he received his doctorate in clinical and counseling psychology from Utah State University.

Career

Early career 
After graduation, Dehlin worked for five years in software and as a consultant for Bain & Company, Arthur Andersen, Citicorp, Heidrick & Struggles, and the LDS Church. He then worked at Microsoft for seven years in programs for developers, marketing, speech technologies, and product demos.

In 2004, Dehlin moved to Logan, Utah, to begin work under David A. Wiley at Utah State University (USU) on OpenCourseWare-related projects. Dehlin would serve two years as USU's OpenCourseWare Consortium Coordinator and Director of Outreach for the Center for Open and Sustainable Learning, promoting OpenCourseWare to other universities, and a few years as director of the OpenCourseWare Consortium for the Massachusetts Institute of Technology (MIT). In January 2007, MIT hired Dehlin as the Director of the OpenCourseWare Consortium.

Sunstone
During Dehlin's early career developing massive open online courses (MOOCs) he had branched into Latter-day Saint themed new media. Dehlin approached the Sunstone Education Foundation and presented to its board of directors about the importance of participating in developing internet communities through blogging and podcasting, in order to address the then limited internet presence for constructive Mormon intellectual sources. The Board accepted his offer to initiate these programs and, in September 2005, Dehlin joined the Board of Directors and began a Sunstone podcast as well as SunstoneBlog. In July 2007, he also became executive director of the Sunstone Education Foundation, in which he was to focus on strategic initiatives to strengthen Sunstone's position as an open forum for Mormon issues. In that role, he increased organizational focus on its longstanding motto, "faith seeking understanding", and worked to attract new and younger membership. Dehlin resigned from Sunstone in January 2008.

Mormon Stories 

In September 2005, after experiencing doubts in his faith and subsequently finding reasons to remain a member of the LDS Church, Dehlin created the Mormon Stories podcast as an open discussion of Mormon issues, intending to give listeners reasons to remain in the church. Through interviews, Mormon Stories focused on varying Mormon experiences and perspectives.  Mormon Stories has been featured in many venues, including being broadcast on KVNU in Logan, Utah.

Intermittently conflicted about continuing Mormon Stories, Dehlin stopped and restarted the project a few times. In January 2010 Dehlin resumed the blog and podcast, focusing on faith crises and mental illness. The podcast has featured many notable guests, beginning with interviews of Joanna Brooks and John C. Hamer. Two other regular hosts joined Dehlin in conducting interviews for the podcast: Dan Wotherspoon, former editor of Sunstone magazine; and Natasha Helfer Parker, a licensed clinical marriage and family therapist.

Other blogs 
In June 2007, Dehlin started Mormon Matters as a blog and weekly podcast. The format was a discussion panel on events, culture, politics and spirituality within Mormonism. Panelists were to represent different sides of each issue, although the show later struggled to retain regular conservative LDS panelists. In early 2008, Dehlin converted Mormon Matters into a group blog and lessened emphasis on new podcast episodes. Dehlin resumed the Mormon Matters podcast on March 5, 2011, with Dan Wotherspoon as the host and Joanna Brooks as a frequent co-host.

Dehlin is also the co-founder of the pro-LGBT Mormons for Marriage website. He co-founded Stay LDS, a community that was dedicated to helping unorthodox Mormons stay in the LDS Church.

Dehlin briefly blogged at a non-partisan religion website Patheos.com in a current-issues/events dialogue format with Mormon studies scholar Patrick Q. Mason.

LDS Church membership
From 1988 to 1990, Dehlin served as an LDS Church missionary in Guatemala. According to Dehlin, his mission began baptizing up to 700 converts per month using practices he believed to be deceptive. After reporting this to his mission president, Dehlin was transferred to an area that stoked his allergies, and he was subsequently sent home. He chose to resume mission service, and was reassigned to finish his two-year missionary term in the U.S. in Tempe, Arizona. Dehlin remained an active, faithful member of the LDS Church for the next 20 years.

In the Spring of 2011, Dehlin stated he had become inactive in the LDS Church (i.e., not attending weekly services), citing an inability to believe some of the church's claims.

In 2014, Dehlin was investigated by his local church leaders regarding his online activity, culminating in a request by Dehlin for greater privacy. Prior to 2014, Dehlin had faced church disciplinary hearings without any resulting disciplinary action. In January 2015, Dehlin's stake president initiated another disciplinary council, which determined Dehlin's online activity constituted apostasy. He was excommunicated for "conduct contrary to the laws and order of the church." Dehlin appealed to the First Presidency on March 10, 2015, stating his actions had not met the church's definition of apostasy. In July and August 2015, the First Presidency notified Dehlin via his stake president of the denial of his appeal. As of 2015, Dehlin still considered himself LDS.

In 2021, John Dehlin further continued the development of his podcast on the trajectory towards helping people recognize the damage which high demand religions such as the LDS Church can cause.

See also
 Jeremy Runnells, prominent critic of the LDS church
 Kate Kelly, American Mormon feminist

References

External links 
 Official site
 Mormon Stories, Dehlin's most well-known blog and podcast
 Dehlin's list of episodes for Mormon Stories, Sunstone, and Mormon Matters
 "5 Questions After 5 Years – From A Longtime 'Nacle Wannabe," by John Dehlin
 Ldspsychology.com, one of Dehlin's blogs, started in 2009

Multi-media
 
 
 

WorldCat
 

20th-century Mormon missionaries
American male bloggers
American bloggers
Former Latter Day Saints
American Mormon missionaries in Guatemala
American podcasters
Brigham Young University alumni
American LGBT rights activists
Living people
Mormon studies scholars
Mormon bloggers
OpenCourseWare
Utah State University alumni
21st-century American historians
American male non-fiction writers
People excommunicated by the Church of Jesus Christ of Latter-day Saints
1969 births
21st-century American male writers